The Netherlands national korfball team represents the Netherlands in international korfball. It is controlled by the Royal Dutch Korfball Association (KNKV), the governing body of korfball in the Netherlands.

They are the most successful national korfball team in the world; having won ten of the eleven World Championships (only non-win came in 1991 when they lost in the final against Belgium) and all eight editions of the European Championships and all nine editions of the World Games.

Tournament history

Current squad

References

External links
 Koninklijk Nederlands Korfbalverbond

National korfball teams
Korfball
National Team